The 1987 Utah Utes football team represented the University of Utah as a member of the Western Athletic Conference (WAC) during the 1987 NCAA Division I-A football season.  In their third season under head coach Jim Fassel, the Utes compiled an overall record of 5–7 with a mark of 2–6 against conference opponents, finished in seventh place in the WAC, and were outscored by their opponents 362 to 321. The team played home games at Robert Rice Stadium in Salt Lake City.

Utah's statistical leaders included Chris Mendonca with 2,389 passing yards, Martel Black with 520 rushing yards, and Carl Harry with 826 receiving yards.

Schedule

Roster

References

Utah
Utah Utes football seasons
Utah Utes football